βk-2C-B (Bk-2C-B; 2-Amino-1-(4-bromo-2,5-dimethoxyphenyl)ethan1-one) is a novel psychedelic substance. It is the beta (β) ketone structural analogue of 2C-B, a psychedelic drug of the 2C family. It is used as a recreational drug, usually taken orally. βk-2C-B is a controlled substance in Canada, Germany, Switzerland, and the United Kingdom.

History 
βk-2C-B is a designer drug, more specifically it is the beta keto analogue of the controlled substance 2C-B (2,5-dimethoxy-4-bromophenethylamine) which was first synthesized by Alexander Shulgin. It is unknown who first synthesized βk-2C-B, but it first appeared on the market mid-2013 as a recreational drug. In the years thereafter, several papers reporting analytical characterizations of the substance appeared. It is offered online and is termed a psychedelic drug. Since 12 October 2016, βk-2C-B has become a controlled substance (Schedule III) in Canada. It is also illegal in Germany, Switzerland and the United Kingdom.

Chemistry 
βk-2C-B is a substituted phenethylamine. It features methoxy substituents at R2 and R5 and a bromine at R4. A ketone group is present at the beta (β) position from the functional amine group connected to the alpha (α) carbon, giving rise to its name indicating it being a structural analogue of 2C-B. Because of the ketone functional group, it is correctly referred to as a ketophenethylamine. It has been mistakenly referred to as a "substituted cathinone" however cathinones by definition are ketoamphetamines and βk-2C-B is not an amphetamine.

Synthesis 
This synthetic route was replicated by Power et al. and consists of the following steps:

 Grignard reaction with methylmagnesium bromide
 Oxidation (e.g. using pyridinium chlorochromate (PCC))
 α-bromination
 Reaction with hexamethylenetetramine
 Acid hydrolysis

The mechanism for this synthetic pathway involves an initial nucleophilic attack on the ketone carbon of the starting compound, which yields a secondary alcohol. The oxidation of which, by use of a strong oxidative agent such as PCC, converts it back to a ketone. The vicinal primary carbon is easily brominated by ketone halogenation. Then a Delépine reaction is employed to convert the alkyl halide to a primary amine, affording βk-2C-B as a mixed hydrochloride/hydrobromide salt.

The Delépine reaction step has the advantage that it has simple reaction conditions, short reaction times and makes use of cheap and easily available reagents and apparatus.

Reactions

Dimerization 
The primary amine of βk-2c-b can react with the beta ketone of a second βk-2C-B molecule and vice versa to form two imine bonds between the two molecules. Water is eliminated in this reversible reaction. The process of imine formation is, however, pH dependent, and is generally greatest near the pH of 5. At high pH there is not enough acid to protonate the hydroxyl group, while at low pH most of the amine reactant will be protonated and therefore lose its nucleophilicity, which is a prerequisite for the reaction to occur. While imine formation is favored in slightly acidic environments, there has been experimental evidence that the intramolecular reaction proceeds readily for βk-2c-b at neutral pH. When imine formation is present to full extent between two βk-2C-B molecules, a purple pyrazine dimer is formed. The dimer can be converted back to βk-2C-B by imine hydrolysis: a process where acid catalysis is possible, but not an absolute requirement.

Pyrolysis 
The thermal decomposition of βk-2C-B has been studied using a simulated ‘meth pipe’ scenario. Twelve major pyrolysis products were found for the thermally-induced decomposition of βk-2C-B. Some of these compounds have known properties. For example, the α-chloro ketones are known to express some level of toxicity, while others were not only found safe, but even some of their analogues have been applied in medicine. An example would be 1-bromo-4-(2-bromoethyl)-2,5-dimethoxybenzene, which has been patented as a compound suitable for glaucoma treatment.

Pharmacology and toxicology

Routes of administration 
As is common for most classes of drugs in the phenethylamine family, oral administration has been reported as the go-to route of administration for βk-2C-B. Other routes of entry such as insufflation are generally not recommended by users because, similarly to 2C-B, βk-2C-B will irritate the mucous membrane that lines the nasal cavity. Furthermore, partial dimerization of the βk-2C-B will occur, since the nasal passages are slightly basic, forming a pharmacologically-inactive dimer. There are numerous reports of users experiencing intense pain in the nasal region and the excretion of purple colored mucus following insufflation of βk-2C-B, with the latter suggesting a lower bioavailability for this route of administration as compared to ingestion.

Dosage 
βk-2C-B is said to be 10 times less potent than 2C-B because it requires higher doses for the same perceived effect. A threshold dose of 50–60 mg is often reported. Normal dosage ranges between 60 to 150 mg are generally followed by users, who also report a steep dose-response curve around the upper limit of this dosage range. Nevertheless, there are several testimonies reporting a clear effect is achieved at 100 mg dose. These reports express that βk-2C-B has a commencement of action of 20 to 70 minutes and that a significant psychological effect is observed with a total duration of 8 to 12 hours. Despite being seen as a relatively safe compound within the dosage range listed above, there has been a report of a healthy 25 year-old male user who had cardiac arrest following a dose of 140 mg. Attending this and other experiences, users recommend not taking a dose above 100 to 120 mg because the perceived effects do not change notoriously for higher doses and it is more likely to cause toxic effects and will thus be dangerous when approaching the more steep dose-response curve.

Pharmacodynamics

Structure-activity relationships 
Attending the chemical structure of βk-2C-B, various possible interactions can take place between the compound and target receptors in the body. The functional groups within the structure are will exert pharmacological activity at receptor sites. The most notable structure-activity relationships (SAR) for βk-2C-B are hydrogen bonding, dipole-dipole interactions, van der Waals interactions and the polar hydrophobic nature of the bromine atom. Four distinct SARs are proposed for βk-2C-B:

 Hydrogen bonding of the primary amine  Hydrogen bond donor character is evident at the protons of the primary amine, while acceptor character follows from the lone pair. Often, the amine may be protonated when it interacts with its target binding site, which immediately leads to its ionization and cannot therefore act as a hydrogen bond acceptor
 Dipole-dipole interaction of the β-ketone  The permanent dipole moment follows from the ketone within the structure of βk-2C-B allows a van der Waals dipole-dipole attraction between the substrate and target binding site. Furthermore, lone pairs of the carbonyl oxygen will also cause hydrogen bonding character.
 Hydrophobic interactions of the aromatic ring  The planar aromatic ring structure present within the phenethylamine backbone of βk-2C-B can cause hydrophobic interactions with flat hydrophobic regions of target binding sites. Furthermore, the ring substituted methoxy groups can exert van der Waals interactions and poses hydrogen bond acceptor ability.
 Interactions of the bromine  The bromine atom has an increasing effect on the affinity to receptors because of its polar hydrophobic nature. In addition, bromine is a very electronegative atom and will expand the electron cloud of nucleophilic binding sites.

Binding affinities 
Like other substituted cathinones of the phenethylamine family, βk-2C-B is suggested to show affinity for different subtypes of serotonin 5-HT2 receptor. As with other 2C compounds, interference with the reuptake of dopamine, serotonin, and noradrenaline is also possible. There is not sufficient study on the affinity for this compound for specific receptors, so correlation of affinities with the general pharmacodynamics of the 2C family must proceed with caution. However, the activity of βk-2C-B at the 5-HT2A receptor has been studied. It was shown that the introduction of the β-ketone to the structure of 2C-B significantly lowers the binding affinity of βk-2C-B at the receptor site. In an assay measuring β-arrestin2 recruitment to the 5-HT2A receptor, the registered EC50 and efficacy (in comparison to LSD) for βk-2C-B are reported to be 905 nM and 40.8%, respectively. In addition, at a concentration below the registered EC50, namely at 270 nM, βk-2C-B has shown to cause a low to 50% agonistic response to the μ-opioid receptor. Lastly, the affinity of βk-2C-B towards monoamine-oxidase (MAO) has been studied. Inhibition caused by βk-2C-B is evident at an IC50 value of 1.1 μM for MAO-B whereas for MAO-A much higher doses, normally above 10 μMm were required.

Pharmacokinetics 
Not much is known about the pharmacokinetics of βk-2C-B, as it is a novel psychedelic. Clearance from and biotransformation of the compound within the body is therefore hard to interpret. Moreover, assessment of toxicity caused by βk-2C-B is not possible at the current state of research on this compound. This is common for many designer drugs and therefore recreational use is ill-advised.

However, extrapolation from its parent compound is possible but not conclusive. In general, compounds of the 2C family have been shown to be metabolized by liver hepatocytes, resulting in deamination and demethylation. Oxidative deamination is common, and substitutes of dimethoxybenzoic acid can be produced following this route of biotransformation. Further metabolism may occur by demethylation.

In contrast, βk-2C-B has a relatively high dosage compared to the members of the 2C family. This indicates that affinities for the pharmacologically active sites drastically differ between these compounds. Qualitatively, however, effects are similar for this higher dosage, which could translate to higher toxicity. Also, its longer half-life would increase exposure at specific sites within the body, possibly giving rise to increased toxic response for βk-2C-B as when compared to 2C-B. Like the compounds in the 2C family, species differentiation is likely for the metabolism of βk-2C-B. This because the enzyme expressions for the biotransformation enzymes can differ dramatically between species and sex.

Furthermore, drug-drug interactions (DDI) are possible for βk-2C-B. For example, the inhibition of MAO caused by βk-2C-B could potentiate drugs that mimic amine neurotransmitters in their function. This because the amine neurotransmitters norepinephrine, epinephrine, serotonin and dopamine all show biotransformation pathways where monoamine oxidase is principally responsible for degradation.

Effects 
The relatively small amount of research towards the effect of the compounds within the 2C family translates to βk-2C-B as well, with close to no research being conducted at all within this field of interest. Most of the knowledge available is reported anecdotally by recreational users. Often, main described pronounce effects are open and closed-eye visuals, time distortion and euphoria. These effects are common for most psychedelics in the substituted phenethylamine class.

There is a strong similarity between the subjective effects caused by βk-2C-B and 2C-B. However, βk-2C-B is often described to be more stimulating and less psychedelic. This, combined with its long duration, could increase the perceived severity of the effects. Also, physiological stress could follow from βk-2C-B. This because, much like 2C-B, an elevated heart rate and blood pressure is often reported. This could further potentiate the perceived sense of euphoria, perception (namely color intensity) and bodily feelings.

Tolerance 
Like other psychedelics, βk-2C-B is regarded as non-addictive and subsequent dosing intervals will generally increase tolerance to βk-2C-B and other psychedelic substances. This form of cross-tolerance is extremely common and well-described for compounds sharing similar mechanisms of action as psychedelic phenethylamine derivatives do.

Availability 
As with other novel psychedelic substances, βk-2C-B is readily available for purchase online as it is unregulated in most countries. Generally, it is listed online as a psychedelic substance which is available ‘for research purposes only’ and ‘not for human consumption’. The target market listed is often for in vitro purposes only.

Legal status 
βk-2C-B is a controlled substance in the following countries:

 Canada: βk-2C-B is a Schedule III controlled substance as of October 12, 2016.
 Germany: βk-2C-B is controlled under the New Psychoactive Substances Act (NpSG) as of November 26, 2016. Possession is illegal but not penalized.
 Sweden: βk-2C-B was classified as a narcotic on April 5, 2019.
 Switzerland: βk-2C-B is a controlled substance specifically named under Verzeichnis E.,
 United Kingdom: βk-2C-B is illegal to produce, supply or import under the Psychoactive Substance Act as of May 26, 2016.
 United States: βk-2C-B is unscheduled in the U.S., but may be considered an analogue of 2C-B under the Federal Analogue Act, and thus a Schedule I drug.

Hazards 
No hazards specifically for βk-2C-B have been reported, but there are some common hazardous effects found in 2C-phenethylamines which could be present for βk-2C-B. These include chills, nausea, anxiety, confusion, agitation, hypertension, seizures and death. Use of βk-2C-B may lead to hallucinations and violence, as well as dis-coordination; these could have severe consequences, not only for the user, but also the general public. The severity of such effects occurring depends on the dosage, with the risk increasing at higher doses. Both the USA and UK have reported both non-fatal and fatal intoxications with 2C-phenethylamines and substitutions of this family of psychoactive substances.

See also 
 2C-B
 β-Methyl-2C-B
 BOB (psychedelic)
 Psychedelic
 Substituted cathinone
 Substituted phenethylamines

References 

Bromoarenes
Designer drugs
Psychedelic phenethylamines
Serotonin receptor agonists